Dale V. Dawkins (born October 30, 1966) is a former American football wide receiver who played for the New York Jets.

College
Dale played football for the University of Miami from 1987 to 1989 as a wide receiver.

1987: 2 catches for 20 yards.
1988: 31 catches for 488 yards and 3 TD.
1989: 54 catches for 833 yards and 7 TD.

Professional
Dawkins was drafted by the New York Jets in the 9th Round of the 1990 NFL Draft. He was selected 223rd overall. As a rookie, he had just 5 catches for 68 yards. In 1991, he had 3 catches for 38 yards. He only played in 10 more games through the 1993 NFL Season.

References

1966 births
Living people
American football wide receivers
Miami Hurricanes football players
New York Jets players
People from Vero Beach, Florida
Players of American football from Florida
Vero Beach High School alumni
Ed Block Courage Award recipients